Metangula is a small town on the shores of Lake Niassa, 110 kilometers from the provincial capital of Lichinga in Niassa Province, Mozambique. A few kilometers north of Metangula lies the beautiful sand beach of Chuanga. The main agricultural crops from the area are cassava (mandioca) and Vigna beans (feijāo nhemba).

Populated places in Niassa Province